Discretion is the ability to act or make a decision according to one's own choice.

Discretion may also refer to:

Judicial discretion, the power of the judiciary to make some decisions according to their discretion
"Discretion," a song by Pedro the Lion from the album Achilles Heel
Discretion (album), an album by saxophonist Tim Berne's Bloodcount